Kevin Barrett is a game designer who has worked primarily on role-playing games.

Career
Kevin Barrett collaborated with Terry K. Amthor in the creation of Spacemaster (1985), the science-fiction version of Rolemaster, which also had a second edition in 1988. The first miniatures game from Iron Crown Enterprises was Barrett's Silent Death (1990), which initially used the Spacemaster background.

By 1992, Barrett had left ICE. He later worked as writer at BioWare.

References

External links
 

Living people
Role-playing game designers
Year of birth missing (living people)